Carolina Valencia Hernández (born February 8, 1985 in Chetumal, Quintana Roo, Mexico) is a female weightlifter from Mexico. She won the gold medal at the 2007 Pan American Games for her native North American country in the − 48 kg weight division.

References
the-sports.org

External links

1985 births
Living people
People from Chetumal, Quintana Roo
Weightlifters at the 2007 Pan American Games
Sportspeople from Quintana Roo
Mexican female weightlifters
World Weightlifting Championships medalists
Pan American Games gold medalists for Mexico
Pan American Games medalists in weightlifting
Central American and Caribbean Games gold medalists for Mexico
Competitors at the 2006 Central American and Caribbean Games
Central American and Caribbean Games medalists in weightlifting
Medalists at the 2007 Pan American Games
21st-century Mexican women